The Korean language has a system of honorifics that recognizes and reflects the hierarchical social status of participants with respect to the subject and/or the object and/or the audience. Speakers use honorifics to indicate their social relationship with the addressee and/or subject of the conversation, concerning their age, social status, gender, degree of intimacy, and speech act situation.

One basic rule of Korean honorifics is ‘making oneself lower’; the speaker can use honorific forms and also use humble forms to make themselves lower.

The honorific system is reflected in honorific particles, verbs with special honorific forms or honorific markers and special honorific forms of nouns that includes terms of address.

Honorific particles in an honorific sentence

The Korean language can index deference or respect toward a sentence referent in subject or dative position through the application of lexical choices such as honorific particles.

There is no honorific expression for inanimate '에(-e)'. The honorific version of '에게(-ege)' is '께(-kke)'.

For example,  while -선생님- (-seonsaengnim-) ‘teacher’ is neutral and -선생님이- (-seonsaengnimi-) denotes the role of the noun as the subject of the sentence, -선생님께서- (-seonsaengnimkkeseo-)  still means ‘teacher’, but it indicates that the sentence in which it occurs is an honorific sentence and the speaker is treating the subject, -선생님- (-seonsaengnim-), courteously.

Honorific pronouns and nouns 
In the Korean language, the honorific form of first person pronouns are humble forms, which speakers use to refer to themselves with humble pronouns and humble verb forms to make themself lower.

Korean second person pronouns do not appear in honorific conversation and professional titles and kinship terms are used instead, a phenomenon known as pronoun avoidance. The most common terms of address are kinship terms, which are divided into plain and honorific levels.

The honorific suffix -님 (-nim) is affixed to many kinship terms to make them honorific.  Thus, someone may address his own grandmother as 할머니 (halmeoni) but refer to someone else's grandmother as 할머님 (halmeonim).

Unlike the Japanese language, which allows a title to be used alone for addressing people when an honorific expression is required (e.g., 先生 (sensei) teacher, 社長 (shacho) company president, 教授 (kyojyu) professor), Korean does not allow lone titles for addressing people. It is impolite to address someone as 사장 (sajang) president, 교수 (gyosu) professor, etc. without a suffix such as the honorific suffix -님 (-nim) except when addressing social equals or those lower in status.

Addressee honorification
'상대 높임법 (Addressee Honorification)' refers to the way the speaker uses honorifics towards the listener. '상대 높임법 (Addressee Honorification)' is the most developed honorification in Korean Language which is mainly realized by the closing expression, which is then largely divided into formal and informal forms, and categorised into 6 stages according to the degree of honorific.

Formal forms include:

 the '하십시오 체 (hasipsio form)' which is extremely polite form, 
 the '하오 체 (hao form)' which is moderately addressee-raising, 
 the 하게 체 (hage form)' which is moderately addressee-lowering
 and the '해라 체 (haera form)' which is extremely low form.

Informal forms include the  '해요 체 (haeyo form)' which is informal addressee-raising and  the '해 체 (hae form)' which is informal addressee-lowering.

For example, you can write the following sentence differently by using different closing expressions.
"Read this book."

"이 책을 읽으십시오. (I chaegeul ilgeusipsio.)"  : It uses '하십시오 체 (hasipsio form)'.

"이 책을 읽으시오. (I chaegeul ilgeusio.)" : It uses '하오 체 (hao form)'.

"이 책을 읽게. (I chaegeul ilgge.)" : It uses '하게 체 (hage form)'.

"이 책을 읽어라. (I chaegeul ilgeora.)" : It uses '해라 체 (haera form)'.

"이 책을 읽어요. (I chaegeul ilgeoyo.)" : It uses '해요 체 (haeyo form)'.

"이 책을 읽어. (I chaegeul ilgeo.)" : It uses '해 체 (hae form)'.

One must use honorific sentence endings (습니다 and/or 에요/요) in a formal situation or when addressing acquaintances or strangers, regardless of their age or social status (except pre-adolescent children).  The following are honorific endings for the four major types of sentences:

Declarative: 습니다
Interrogative: 십니까
Prepositive: 습시다 
Imperative: 시요, 십시오

However, one does not need to use honorific endings when speaking to close friends or family members, making honorifics optional.  In this situation, consider the addressee - some like to be addressed with respect while others prefer friendliness.

Declarative: 어/아
Interrogative: 어/아
Prepositive: 어/아 
Imperative: 어/아

The setting, ages, occupations, and other factors contribute to the relations between speaker, addressee, and the referent within this system. Traditionally the Korean honorifics were based on hierarchical relation in society, such as rank in occupations, but this has changed over time to develop into a system based on politeness and closeness. Hierarchical based honorific ending are forgone with relationships such as one between older and younger sibling in which the younger sibling uses the “어/아” endings in place of 어요/아요” without change in respect, instead, exhibiting closeness in the relationship. Furthermore, the use of “chondae-n mal” (high formal speech) towards someone who is perceived as close could be rude and insensitive, whereas, the use of “pan mal” towards one who is a stranger or distant in social relation would be rude.

Honorific verbs

When the subject of the conversation is older or has higher seniority than the speaker, the Korean honorific system primarily index the subject by adding the honorific suffix -시 (-si) or -으시 (-eusi) into the stem verb.

Thus, 가다 (gada, "to go") becomes 가시다 (gasida). A few verbs have suppletive honorific forms:

A few verbs have suppletive humble forms, used when the speaker is referring to themself in polite situations. These include 드리다 (deurida) and 올리다 (ollida) for 주다 (juda, "give"). 드리다 (deurida) is substituted for 주다 (juda) when the latter is used as an auxiliary verb, while 올리다 (ollida, literally "raise up") is used for 주다 (juda) in the sense of "offer".

Honorific forms of address
Pronouns in Korean have their own set of polite equivalents (e.g., 저 (jeo) is the humble form of 나 (na, "I") and 저희 (jeohui) is the humble form of 우리 (uri, "we")). However, Korean language allows for coherent syntax without pronouns, effectively making Korean a so-called pro-drop language; thus, Koreans avoid using the second-person singular pronoun, especially when using honorific forms. Third-person pronouns are occasionally avoided as well, mainly to maintain a sense of politeness. Although honorific form of 너 (neo, singular "you") is 당신 (dangsin, literally, "friend" or "dear"), that term is used only as a form of address in a few specific social contexts, such as between people who are married to each other, or in an ironic sense between strangers. Other words are usually substituted where possible (e.g., the person's name, a kinship term, a professional title, the plural 여러분 yeoreobun, or no word at all, relying on context to supply meaning instead).

Spacing spelling convention
The National Institute of Korean Language classifies nim/ssi/gun/yang as dependent nouns that follow a proper noun, and they prescribe that a space should appear between a noun and its dependent noun. (e.g. Jaebeom nim 재범 님) This is not to be confused with the affix -nim used with common nouns, since affixes are written without spaces. (e.g. seonsaengnim 선생님)

-A / -ya
Korean has the vocative case markers which grammatically identify a person (animal, object etc.) being addressed so that they eliminate possible grammatical ambiguities. -a or -ya (Hangul: 아, 야) is a casual title used at the end of names. It is not gender exclusive. If a name ends in a consonant -a is used (e.g. Jinyoung-a 진영아), while -ya is used if the name ends in a vowel (e.g. Yeji-ya 예지야). -a / -ya is used only between close friends and people who are familiar with each other, and its use between strangers or distant acquaintances would be considered extremely rude. -ya / -a is only used hierarchically horizontally or downwards: an adult or parent may use it for young children, and those with equal social standing may use it with each other, but a young individual will not use -a or -ya towards one who is older than oneself or holds a higher status than oneself.

Middle Korean had three classes of the vocative case but practically only -아 / -야 is remaining in everyday life. -여 / -이여 is only used in literature and archaic expressions, and -하 has completely disappeared. See Korean vocative case for more information.

Ssi
Ssi (씨, 氏) is the most commonly used honorific used amongst people of approximately equal speech level. It is attached after the full name, such as 'Lee Seokmin ssi'' (이석민 씨), or simply after the first name, ''Seokmin ssi'' (석민 씨) if the speaker is more familiar with someone. Appending ssi to the surname, for instance  ''Park ssi'' (박 씨) can be quite rude, as it indicates the speaker considers himself to be of a higher social status than the person he is speaking to.

Nim, -nim
Nim (Hangul: 님) (by itself after a proper noun) is the highest form of honorifics and above ssi. Nim will follow addressees' names on letters/emails and postal packages. It is often roughly translated as "Mr." or "Ms./Mrs.". -nim (as an affix) is used as a commonplace honorific for guests, customers, clients, and unfamiliar individuals. -nim is also used towards someone who is revered and admired for having a significant amount of skill, intellect, knowledge, etc. and is used for people who are of a higher rank than oneself. Examples include family members (eomeonim 어머님 & abeonim 아버님), teachers (seonsaengnim 선생님), clergy (e.g. pastors – moksanim 목사님), and gods (haneunim 하느님 / hananim 하나님).

Seonbae/hubae
Seonbae (선배, 先輩) is used to address senior colleagues or mentor figures relating to oneself (e.g. older students in school, older/more experienced athletes, mentors, senior colleagues in academia, business, work, etc.). As with English titles such as Doctor, seonbae can be used either by itself or as a title. Hubae (후배, 後輩) is used to refer to juniors. Usually, people in senior and junior relationships call each other '선배님 (Seonbaenim)' (e.g. Chaeryeong seonbaenim 채령 선배님) and '후배님(Hubaenim)' at the first meeting.

Gun/yang
Gun (군, 君) is used moderately in formal occasions (such as weddings), for young, unmarried males. gun is also used to address young boys by an adult.  yang (양, 孃) is the female equivalent of gun and is used to address young girls. Both are used in a similar fashion to ssi, following either the whole name or the first name in solitude.
For example, if the boy's name is '김유겸 (Kim Yugyeom)', it is used as '김유겸 군 (Kim Yugyeom-gun) 유겸 군 (Yugyeom-gun)'. And if the girl's name is '임나연 (Im Nayeon)', she can be called as '임나연 양 (Im Nayeon-yang)' or '나연 양 (Nayeon-yang)'.

Less common forms of address
 Gwiha (귀하, 貴下) can be seen commonly in formal letters, often used by a company to a client.
 Gakha (각하, 閣下) is used only in extremely formal occasions, usually when addressing presidents, high officials, or bishops and archbishops. Somewhat avoided nowadays due to its connotations to Imperial Japan.
 Hapha (합하, 閤下) was used to address the father of the king who was not a king (Daewongun), or the oldest son of the crown prince.
 Jeoha (저하, 邸下) was only used when addressing the crown prince.
 Jeonha (전하, 殿下) was only used when addressing kings, now mostly used to address cardinals.
 Pyeha (폐하, 陛下) was used only when addressing emperors.
 Seongha (성하, 聖下) is used when addressing popes, patriarchates or the Dalai Lama; the equivalent of the English word "His Holiness" or "His Beatitude".
 Nari (나리) or alternatively, naeuri (나으리), was used by commoners in the Joseon Dynasty to refer to people of higher status but below daegam (대감, 大監), English equivalent of "His Excellency". The honorific is of native Korean origin.

Relative honorifics
When speaking to someone about another person, you must calculate the relative difference in position between the person you are referring to and the person you are speaking to. This is known as apjonbeop 압존법(壓尊法) or “relative honorifics”.

'압존법 (Relative honorifics)' is usually used in the home or relationship between teacher and student. For example, "할아버지, 아버지가 아직 안 왔습니다. (Harabeoji, abeojiga ajik an watseumnida.)" means "Grandfather, father hasn't come yet." Both grandfather and father are in higher position than the speaker, but grandfather is much higher than father. In this special case, Korean do not use honorific expression on father to admire grandfather.
Therefore, in this sentence, "아버지가 (abeojiga)" is used rather than "아버지께서 (abeojikkeseo)" and "왔습니다(watseumnida)" rather than "오셨습니다 (osyeotseumnida)".

For example, one must change the post positional particle and verb if the person you are speaking to is a higher position (age, title, etc.) than the person you are referring to. "부장님, 이 과장님께서는 지금 자리에 안 계십니다 (bujangnim, I gwajangnimkkeseoneun jigeum jarie an gyesimnida)" This means, "General Manager, Manager Lee is not at his desk now", with the bolded parts elevating the manager higher than the general manager, even though they both are in a higher position than you. The general manager would be offended by the fact that you elevated the manager above him.
However, '압존법(Relative honorifics)' in the workplace is far from Korean traditional language etiquette. In front of the superior, lowering another superior who is in a lower position may apply in private relationships, such as between family members and between teacher and student.
But it is awkward to use it at the workplace.
Therefore, the above sentence can be modified according to workplace etiquette as follows.
"부장님, 이 과장님은 지금 자리에 안 계십니다. (Bujangnim, I gwajangnimeun jigeum jarie an gyesimnida.)"

Humble Speech 
Korean also has humble speech, usually denoted with the inclusion of the affix -오- [-o-].

Humble Suffix 
The humble suffix has the effect of lowering the status of the speaker against  the addressee, thereby increasing the degree of respect shown by the former toward the latter. The humble suffix, is rare  nowadays in Standard Seoul dialect, however, it is employed in religious services as well as historical literary or entertainment media. 

The humble suffix appears in four different allomorphs: 

1. 오 (o)  / (으)오 (euo):

2.  사오 (sao)

3. 옵 (op) / (으)옵 (euop):

4. 사옵 (saop)

Difference between humble and honorific suffix 
The honorific suffix -시/(으)시  and the humble suffix, both employed to express the speaker's respect, are different from one another in that the

honorific suffix directs the speaker's respect to the subject of a sentence, whereas the humble suffix directs it to the addressee. And of course the

respect shown by the humble suffix is the result of degradation  of the speaker's status against the addressee(s), examples:

 선생님이 오셔  [seongnimi osyeo] - The teacher is coming - context student taking to other student in casual informal style while giving respect to teacher by employing honorific affix 셔 [시 + 어]
 아이가 가옵니다 [aiga gaomnida] - The child is going - context a servant speaking to master in formal polite style while humbling himself with affix -옵- [op] showing no deference to the subject [아이-child]
 할머님이 오시옵니다 [halmeonimi osiomnida] - Grandmother/Old-Lady is coming  - context a child speaking to an elder or someone in high authority in formal polite style while humbling himself with affix -옵- [op] while also showing deference to the subject [할머님-old lady] by employing the honorific affix -시- [si].

Use in modern speech 
The humble affix is still used at certain times for example in "but/even-though" statements as is -오나. For instance the President Yoon Suk-yeol in 2022 was asked a question:

 정말 외람되오나 [jeongmal oeramdoeona] - It is very impudent of me but [can I ask you]

See also
 Korean speech levels

Other languages 
 T–V distinction (politeness differences more generally)
 Chinese honorifics
 Chinese titles
 Japanese honorifics

References

Further reading
 Sohn, Ho-min (2006). Korean Language in Culture and Society. University of Hawai‘i Press: KLEAR Textbooks.

Honorifics by country
Honorifics
Honorifics by language